Mickey's Nightmare is a 1932 Walt Disney short black and white cartoon starring Mickey Mouse and Pluto. It was the 44th Mickey Mouse short, and the eighth of that year. The plot incorporates elements from Disney's first Oswald the Lucky Rabbit cartoon, Poor Papa.

Synopsis
It is nighttime and Mickey Mouse is doing his night prayers before bedtime. As he gets into bed, Pluto joins Mickey, but gets sent to his basket. As soon as Mickey falls asleep, Pluto creeps back into Mickey's bed and licks his face. Mickey dreams about proposing to Minnie, and getting married.

After the wedding, Mickey and Pluto are in the garden watering the flowers. A stork comes by and drops the first batch of baby mice into the chimney of Mickey and Minnie's home. But then, more baby mice start to arrive by the same stork and a bucketful of them are poured down the chimney. Mickey rushes inside to find Minnie Mouse in bed with many baby mice. They all start to chase and play rough with their father along with their pet dog. Soon, the baby mice start to use paintbrushes to paint the wall and ceiling in black paint. They also throw pillows at Mickey landing on his face. But the last one smacks Mickey so hard, that his jug is now in pieces.

The children then paint the house with ink with one even using the pet cat to paint. Mickey is then in a tight tangle whilst the paint is licking across his face, the telephone is ringing and the cuckoo clock is crowing. But in Mickey's bedroom, he finds himself wrapped up in his bedclothes with Pluto licking across his face and the rooster is crowing whilst his alarm clock is ringing. Mickey wakes up and realizes it's a dream and his determination now is to never marry Minnie. The cartoon ends with Pluto licking Mickey’s face.

Voice cast
 Mickey Mouse: Walt Disney
 Minnie Mouse: Marcellite Garner
 Goofy: Pinto Colvig

See also
 Porky's Romance
 Mickey Mouse (film series)

References

External links
 
 

1932 films
1932 animated films
Films set in 1932
1930s Disney animated short films
Films directed by Burt Gillett
Films produced by Walt Disney
Mickey Mouse short films
Films about nightmares
American black-and-white films
Animated films about dogs
1930s American films